The Chapada mine is one of the larger gold mines in Brazil, and in the world.

The mine is located in Goiás state, in the central part of Brazil.

The mine has estimated reserves of 6 million oz of gold and 3.8 million oz of silver.  Yamana Gold announced the sale of the Chapada mine to Lundin Mining on the 15th of April 2019.

References 

Gold mines in Brazil
Silver mines in Brazil
Geography of Goiás